The 2017 AFL season was the 92nd season in the Australian Football League (AFL) contested by the North Melbourne Football Club. The club finished in 15th place on the ladder after winning only six games.

List changes

Retirements and delistings

Trades

Free agency

Out

National draft

Rookie draft

Season summary

Pre-season

Home and away season

Statistics

Ladder

Honours

Syd Barker Medal
1. Shaun Higgins (217 votes)

2. Ben Cunnington (211 votes)

3. Ben Brown (209 votes)

4. Robbie Tarrant (204 votes)

5. Luke McDonald (192 votes)

6. Jack Ziebell (161 votes)

6. Sam Gibson (161 votes)

8. Taylor Garner (134 votes)

9. Scott Thompson (126 votes)

10. Shaun Atley (125 votes)

AFL Award Nominations
 Round 5 – 2017 AFL Mark of the Year nomination – Taylor Garner
 Round 7 – 2017 AFL Mark of the Year nomination – Kayne Turner
 Round 13 – 2017 AFL Mark of the Year nomination – Jack Ziebell
 Round 16 – 2017 AFL Mark of the Year nomination – Luke McDonald
 Round 16 – 2017 AFL Goal of the Year nomination – Shaun Higgins
 Round 18 – 2017 AFL Goal of the Year nomination – Jarrad Waite
 Round 19 – 2017 AFL Mark of the Year nomination – Ben Brown

Debuts
 Round 1 – Braydon Preuss – AFL Debut
 Round 1 – Declan Mountford – AFL Debut
 Round 1 – Jy Simpkin – AFL Debut
 Round 1 – Mitchell Hibberd – AFL Debut
 Round 1 – Marley Williams – North Melbourne Debut
 Round 1 – Nathan Hrovat – North Melbourne Debut
 Round 3 – Sam Durdin – AFL Debut
 Round 5 – Ed Vickers-Willis – AFL Debut
 Round 16 – Daniel Nielson – AFL Debut
 Round 17 – Cameron Zurhaar – AFL Debut
 Round 18 – Nick Larkey – AFL Debut
 Round 18 – Josh Williams – AFL Debut
 Round 23 – Ben McKay – AFL Debut

Milestones
 Round 3 – Jack Ziebell – 150 Games
 Round 4 – Lindsay Thomas – 200 Games
 Round 4 – Ben Brown – 100th Goal
 Round 6 – Ben Cunnington – 150 Games
 Round 17 – Robbie Tarrant – 100 Games
 Round 18 – Sam Gibson – 50th Goal
 Round 19 – Shaun Atley – 150 Games
 Round 19 – Shaun Higgins – 50 North Melbourne Games
 Round 19 – Ben Brown – 50th Goal in Season
 Round 20 – Jack Ziebell – 100th Goal
 Round 21 – Nathan Hrovat – 50 AFL Games
 Round 23 – Scott Thompson – 200 Games
 Round 23 – Ben Brown – 150th Goal

References

North Melbourne